Veszkény is a village in Győr-Moson-Sopron County, Hungary.

In the 19th century, a small Jewish community lived in the village, many of whose members were murdered in the Holocaust

References

Populated places in Győr-Moson-Sopron County
Jewish communities destroyed in the Holocaust